Persoonia kararae is a species of flowering plant in the family Proteaceae and is endemic to the Perenjori district of Western Australia.

Description
Flowering occurs from September to November and the fruit is a smooth drupe.

Taxonomy
Persoonia kararae was first formally described in 1994 by Peter Weston in the journal Telopea from specimens collected by Ernst Wittwer near the Karara boundary gate in 1975.

Distribution and habitat
This geebung is only known from two collections from Karara Station (now part of the Karara and Lochada Important Bird Area) in the Perenjori district in the Yalgoo biogeographic region of Western Australia.

Conservation status
This species is classified as "Priority Two" by the Western Australian Government Department of Parks and Wildlife meaning that it is poorly known and from only one or a few locations.

References

kararae
Flora of Western Australia
Plants described in 1994
Taxa named by Peter H. Weston